Ten athletes (six men and four women) from Iceland competed at the 1996 Summer Paralympics in Atlanta, United States.

Medals

See also
Iceland at the Paralympics
Iceland at the 1996 Summer Olympics

References 

Nations at the 1996 Summer Paralympics
1996
Summer Paralympics